Aubel is a municipality of Wallonia located in the province of Liège, Belgium. 

On 1 January 2006 the municipality had 4,082 inhabitants. The total area is 18.83 km², giving a population density of 217 inhabitants per km².

The Val-Dieu Abbey is located in the municipality, as is the Siroperie Meurens maker of sirop de Liège.

Market

Aubel is famous for its regional products, these include: cheese, syrup, cider and beer. The market is active on Tuesdays and Sundays. It was very famous in the past and has been continually active since 1630. In the past, people came from far away to sell and buy products. 

Especially the cheese from Aubel is very famous. It is protected as a Herve cheese by a European qualification.

Twin/Sister Towns

 Vernantes, France

Gallery

See also
 List of protected heritage sites in Aubel

References

External links
 
Official website (in French)

 
Municipalities of Liège Province